The Nine Hours of Kyalami is an endurance sports car race contested at Kyalami, Midrand, South Africa. The first races were held from 1958 to 1960 at a circuit at the Grand Central Airport near Midrand before moving to Kyalami in 1961. The event was a mainstay until the late 1980s however it was only held three times between 1989 and 2018. The 1974 event was a round of the World Championship of Makes and the 1983 and 1984 races were rounds of the World Endurance Championship. The event was revived in 2019 as part of the 2019 Intercontinental GT Challenge.

History
From 1965 to 1973, the race was the centerpiece of the South African Springbok Trophy Series. In 1974, the event was part of the World Championship of Makes, switching to a 6 hour/1000 kilometre format.  From 1975 until 1979, the race was held for touring cars. The race returned to sports cars and its 9-hour duration in 1981 and 1982, before being shortened to 1000 km and becoming part of the World Endurance Championship in 1983 and 1984.  After not being held in 1985 due to circuit construction, a 500 km event was contested from 1986 to 1988. After a ten-year hiatus, it was revived as a 2-hour, 30 minute, race as part of the SportsRacing World Cup from 1998 to 2000.

On 27 July 2018, circuit officials announced the nine-hour distance event would return to the calendar starting in 2019 as part of a revamped Intercontinental GT Challenge series from the Stéphane Ratel Organisation. The event will be the final event of a global series of GT3-focused events alongside the Bathurst 12 Hour, California 8 Hours, Spa 24 Hours and Suzuka 10 Hours. The race was originally scheduled for 3 November, but moved to 23 November to avoid a date clash with the 2019 Rugby World Cup.

Grand Central

Kyalami

External links
Racing Sports Cars: South Africa archive
World Sports Racing Prototypes: Non-championship archive, Springbok archive
South African Touring Car Races

Auto races in South Africa
Sports car races
Endurance motor racing
World Sportscar Championship races